Borbjerg is a small village in the western Jutland, Denmark, with a population of 457 (1. January 2022). Borbjerg is located 9 km south of Vinderup and 13 km northeast of Holstebro.

Borbjerg is located in Holstebro Municipality, Region Midtjylland.

References

Villages in Denmark
Cities and towns in the Central Denmark Region
Holstebro Municipality